Gotee Records is a record label of Christian hip-hop, based in Franklin, Tennessee in the United States.

History 
The label was founded in 1994 by TobyMac, Todd Collins and Joey Elwood.  The first album produced is Out of Eden's Lovin' the Day.The label was a part of EMI Christian Music Group. However, they bought back EMI's minority share to become fully independent again as of March 31, 2008. Toby McKeehan is currently the president of the company and as of 2009, the label is currently distributed by Warner Bros. Records.

McKeehan got the name "Gotee" from the song "Socially Acceptable" on dc Talk's album Free at Last. A member of the band GRITS was doing the background vocals, and he was saying, "Let it go, T, let it go." ("T" refers to Toby). McKeehan happened to be growing a goatee on his face at the time, and when Mark Heimermann pointed out the coincidence, he decided to name his new record company, "Gotee Records".

However, McKeehan does not publish his own albums under this title; instead he publishes his own records under the same label dc Talk was signed to, ForeFront Records. He owns the name the Gotee Bros.

In May 2015 Gotee was acquired by Zealot Networks. Zealot's Nashville office is headed by former Gotee artist John Reuben. As part of the acquisition Gotee is still operated independently.

Artists

Current artists
 Cochren & Co.
 Aaron Cole
 Courtnie Ramirez 
 Jon Reddick
 Ryan Stevenson
 Joseph O'Brien
 Terrian (stylized as TERRIAN)
 Richlin (stylized as RICHLIN)
 Aguilar

Former artists 

 Abandon Kansas (active, independent)
 Flynn Adam (active, independent)
 Jeff Anderson (active)
 Capital Kings (disbanded)
 Christafari (active, on Soul of Zion Entertainment)
 Curious Fools (disbanded)
 Jeff Deyo (active, on Indelible Creative Group)
 Deepspace5 (active, on Deepspace5 Records)
 DJ Maj (active, on Tractor-Beam Records)
 Family Force 5 (active, currently Independent)
 Finding Favour (disbanded)
 Fighting Instinct (disbanded)
 4th Avenue Jones (disbanded)
 The Gotee Bros. (disbanded, side project of tobyMac of DC Talk)
 Jamie Grace (active, independent)
 GRITS (on hiatus)
 Hollyn (active, independent)
 House of Heroes (active, currently independent)
 I Am Terrified (active, currently independent)
 The Katinas (active, unsigned)
 Sarah Kelly (active, currently an owner of Sarah Kelly Music School)
 Jennifer Knapp (active, currently unsigned)
 Knowdaverbs (changed name to Verbs; currently with 1280 Music)
 Johnny Q. Public (disbanded)
 LA Symphony (on hiatus; members now performing solo)
 Liquid (active, unsigned)
 Mars Ill (active, on Deepspace5 Records)
 Morgan Harper Nichols (active, independent)
 Our Heart's Hero (disbanded)
 Out of Eden (disbanded)
 Relient K (active, on Mono Vs Stereo Records)
 Stephanie Smith (on hiatus; currently in Copperlily)
 Sonicflood (active on Resonate Records)
 StorySide:B (disbanded)
 B. Reith (active, currently independent)
 John Reuben (active, currently Independent)
 Ayiesha Woods (active, independent)
 Paul Wright (active, unsigned)
 Andy Zipf (active, with P is for Panda Records)

Compilations 
 Gotee Records presents: Showcase
 We Are Hip Hope
 Freaked! A Tribute to dc Talk's Jesus Freak
 Gotee Records Freshman Class 2000
 Gotee Records: The Soundtrack
 Ten Years Brand New
 Gotee Night Out
 Hip Hope Hits collection
 Tis the Season to be Gotee
 Tis the Season to be Gotee Too
 Gotee Records: Twenty Years Brand New

See also
 List of record labels
 EMI Christian Music Group
 Joey Elwood
 Mono Vs. Stereo (Independent Rock Imprint of Gotee)

References

External links 
 
 Gotee Records Photo Group on Flickr Pictures of Gotee artists in concert, with fans, backstage, etc.

 
American record labels
Christian hip hop record labels
Evangelical Christian record labels
EMI
Record labels established in 1994
1994 establishments in Tennessee